Edward David Kennett (born 28 August 1986 in Hastings, England) is a motorcycle speedway rider. He was the British Under-21 Champion in 2005 and has appeared in two Speedway Grand Prix as a wild card.

Kennett's father Dave, was a motorcycle speedway rider who rode for the Eastbourne Eagles, Hackney Hawks, Newport Wasps and the White City Rebels. His uncle Gordon Kennett represented Great Britain, and rode for many clubs. Another uncle, Brian (Barney) Kennett, rode mainly in the British League Division Two/National League for the Canterbury Crusaders during the 1970s and 1980s.

Career
Kennett started his racing career in the Conference League with the Rye House Raiders in 2001. He had his first permanent team place with the Raiders in 2002. The same season he made his Premier League debut for the Rye House Rockets. In 2004, he joined his local club the Eastbourne Eagles in the Elite League. Kennett joined Valsarna speedway, his first team in Sweden 2004. He struggled in his first season and in 2005 he returned to Rye House Rockets in the Premier League.

The 2005 season saw Kennett become the British Under-21 Champion. He also qualified for the World Under-21 final where he finished in eighth place. The Rockets won the Premier League and the Premier Trophy. The Poole Pirates declared Eddie as their 'Number Eight' (first reserve) in the Elite League. He finished fifth in the British Speedway Championship Final and was also selected as a meeting reserve for the British Speedway Grand Prix held at the Millennium Stadium in Cardiff. Kennett decided to stay with Rye House for the 2006 season  in the Premier League with promoter Len Silver who had signed his father for Hackney in 1971.

In 2007, Kennett chose to go back to the Elite League and signed for the Poole Pirates.  He also finished fourth in the British Speedway Championship which ensured he would be a track reserve again for the British Speedway Grand Prix. In September 2007, Kennett was selected to represent Great Britain for the 2007 Under 21-World Cup Final.

Kennett returned to the Eastbourne Eagles in 2008 and won the Elite League Knockout Cup. He also finished as runner-up in the British Speedway Championship to Scott Nicholls and appeared in the British Grand Prix as a wild card.

On 11 August 2011 Kennett resigned from Coventry Speedway; this was because his silencer was deemed 'illegal' when racing against Lakeside on 6 August. Kennett said this was caused by 'a member of his team' who had 'tampered with it'. Kennett was banned from racing for 7 days by the SCB and appeared in front of a disciplinary hearing on 16 August where he received a 6-month worldwide ban.

In 2013 he signed for Premier League Berwick Bandits as a replacement for the injured Ricky Ashworth. He has also been named in the Team Great Britain world cup squad along with Chris Harris, Tai Woffinden and Craig Cook.

In 2022, he rode for the Plymouth Gladiators in the SGB Championship 2022.

Speedway Grand Prix results

World Final appearances

World U-21 Championship
 2005 -  Wiener Neustadt - 8th - 4pts
 2007 -  Ostrów Wlkp. - 11th - 5pts

World Cup
 2007 - 4th - 0pts

U-21 World Cup
 2005 - 10th place (4 pts in Semi-Final A)

European Grasstrack Championship
 2017  Hertingen (Third) 13pts

See also
 List of Speedway Grand Prix riders

References 

1986 births
Living people
British speedway riders
English motorcycle racers
Eastbourne Eagles riders
Plymouth Gladiators speedway riders
Poole Pirates riders
Rye House Rockets riders